Sean Mackie (born 4 November 1998) is a Scottish footballer who plays as a left-back for Falkirk. Mackie has previously played for Raith Rovers, Hibernian, Berwick Rangers, Edinburgh City and Dundee.

Career

Club
Mackie joined Raith Rovers in 2015 from the Fife Elite Academy, signing a two-year contract. He made one first team appearance for Raith before moving to Hibernian in February 2016. Hibs paid a fee of £25,000 for the player.

Mackie was loaned to Berwick Rangers for the first part of the 2016–17 season. He made his first team debut for Hibs in April 2017, in a 3–2 win against Raith Rovers. On 6 July 2017, Mackie joined Scottish League Two club Edinburgh City on a six-month development loan deal.

In July 2019, Mackie signed an extended contract with Hibs. In September 2019, Mackie joined Dundee on loan. This arrangement was curtailed in January 2020 due to Mackie suffering an injury.

Mackie continued to suffer from injury problems over the next two seasons, limiting his appearances for Hibs. With his contract due to expire at the end of the 2021–22 season, he was loaned to former club Raith Rovers in February 2022. While with Raith, Mackie would win the Scottish Challenge Cup. He was released by Hibs in June 2022, at the end of his contract.

On 9 June 2022, Mackie was signed by Scottish League One side Falkirk on a two-year deal.

International
Mackie made one appearance for the Scotland under-21 team, in March 2019.

Career statistics

Honours 
Raith Rovers

 Scottish Challenge Cup: 2021–22

References

1998 births
Living people
Association football fullbacks
Scottish footballers
Scottish Professional Football League players
Raith Rovers F.C. players
Hibernian F.C. players
Berwick Rangers F.C. players
F.C. Edinburgh players
Place of birth missing (living people)
Scotland under-21 international footballers
Dundee F.C. players
Falkirk F.C. players